The 1957–58 West Virginia Mountaineers men's basketball team represented West Virginia University in NCAA competition in the 1957–58 season. Coached by Fred Schaus and featuring future Hall of Fame guard Jerry West, the Mountaineers, then a member of the Southern Conference, lost in the first round of that year's NCAA tournament to Manhattan.

NCAA basketball tournament
East
Manhattan 89, West Virginia 84

Team players drafted into the NBA

References

External links
Official Site

West Virginia Mountaineers men's basketball seasons
Southern Conference men's basketball champion seasons
West Virginia
West Virginia Mountaineers men's b
West Virginia Mountaineers men's b